The 1988–89 Iraqi Pan-National Clubs First Division was the 15th season of the competition since its foundation in 1974 and the first that was played in a group stage format rather than a round-robin format. The name of the league was changed from Iraqi National Clubs First Division to Iraqi Pan-National Clubs First Division. Al-Rasheed won the title by defeating Al-Talaba on penalties in the final, to become the first team to win three Premier League titles in a row.

During the regional stage, if a match ended in a draw, it would go to extra time and then penalties if necessary. A team would earn three points if they won a game by two goals or more after normal time, two points if they won a game by one goal or in extra time, and one point if they won a penalty shootout.

Regional stage

North Group

Central Group

South Group

Baghdad Group

Results

National stage

Group 1

Group 2

Golden stage

Semi-finals

Third place match

Final

Qualification to continental competitions

Season statistics

Top scorers

Hat-tricks

Notes
4 Player scored 4 goals

References

External links
 Iraq Football Association

Iraqi Premier League seasons
1988–89 in Iraqi football
Iraq